Arthur Bernède (5 January 1871 – 20 March 1937) was a French writer, poet, opera librettist, and playwright.

Bernède was born in Redon, Ille-et-Vilaine department, in Brittany. 
In 1919, Bernède joined forces with actor René Navarre, who had played Fantômas in the Louis Feuillade serials, and writer Gaston Leroux, the creator of Rouletabille, to launch the Société des Cinéromans, a production company that would produce films and novels simultaneously. Bernède published almost 200 adventure, mystery, and historical novels. His best-known characters are Belphégor, Judex, Mandrin, Chantecoq, and Vidocq. Bernède also collaborated on plays, poems, and opera libretti with Paul de Choudens; including several operas by Félix Fourdrain.

Bernède also wrote the libretti for a number of operas, among them Jules Massenet's Sapho and Camille Erlanger's L'Aube rouge.

Works 
Opéras, opéras bouffe and vocal pieces

 Phryné, opera by Camille Saint-Saëns
 Marie Fouré, opera by André Fijan (1897), created in Péronne 
 Sapho, opera by Jules Massenet (1897), libretto in collaboration with Henri Cain, with the singer Emma Calvé in the title role
 Ninon de Lenclos, opera by Edmonde Missa (1895), libretto in collaboration with A. Leneka, created at the Opéra-Comique
 Les Petites Vestales, opéra bouffe by Justin Clérice (1900)
 La Légende du Point d'Argentan, pièce lyrique, by Félix Fourdrain (1907)
 La Glaneuse, poème lyrique by Félix Fourdrain (1908), libretto in collaboration with Paul de Choudens
 L'Aube rouge, drame lyrique de Camille Erlanger (1911), libretto in collaboration with Paul de Choudens, created at the Théâtre des Arts de Rouen
 Vercingétorix, opera by Félix Fourdrain (1912), libretto in collaboration with Paul de Choudens
 Madame Roland, opera by Félix Fourdrain (1913), libretto in collaboration with Paul de Choudens
 Les Contes de Perrault, féerie lyrique by Félix Fourdrain (1914), libretto in collaboration with Paul de Choudens, with Yvonne Printemps in the title role.

Theatre plays and monologues

 Le Lycéen (1891), played at the Théâtre Classique
 Le Petit Alsacien
 Revanche!
 Le Bijou de Stéphana (1892), comédie en vaudeville given at the Théâtre de Cluny
 L'Amour à crédit
 La Duchesse de Berry (1900)
 Les Idées de Monsieur Coton (1901), played at the Théâtre de la Renaissance
 La Pipe (1901), performed at the Théâtre de la Renaissance
 La Lune de Miel (1902), in collaboration with Daniel Riche
 Les Tonsurés (1905), anticlerical play
 La Soutane (1905), anticlerical play
 Sous l'Épaulette (1906), play advocating democratization of the army and social justice
 Aux Bat'd'Af (1906), antimilitarist melodrama, written in collaboration with Aristide Bruant
 L'Illustration théâtrale (1906)
 La Loupiote (1909)
 Cœur de Française (1912)
 Un jeune officier pauvre, trilogy (1921)

Popular novels
 
 Mésange, novel (1892)
 La Favorite, novel (1902–1903)
 Le Chevalier aux genêts d'or, novel (1903)
 Les Chevaliers de la mort, novel (1903–1905)
 L'Amant de la Duchesse, historical novel (1906)
 Les Chouans, historical novel (1906)
 Les Amours d'un petit soldat, sentimental novel (1910)
 Cœur de Française, spy novel (1912)
 L'Espionne de Guillaume, spy novel (1914)
 Judex, detective novel (1917)
 L'Aiglonne, historical novel (1922)
 L'Enfant du Palais (1923)
 Belphégor, detective novel (1927)
 Le Miracle des cœurs ou Tes yeux bleus, novel (1927)
 Poker d'As, spy novel (1928)
 Marie-Claire amoureuse or Le Triomphateur, novel (1928)
 Le Capitaine Anthéor, sentimental novel (1930)
 Le Marchand d'hommes, historical novel (1932)
 Vampiria, detective novel (1932)
 L'Espionne d'Hitler, spy novel (1934)
 Le Maître du feu, historical novel (1935)
 En Marge des vivants, novel (1937)
 Le Crime d'un magistrat (1937)
 L'Affaire Bessarabo, detective novel (based on Héra Mirtel)
 L'Affaire Bougrat, detective novel (based on )
 L'Affaire Brierre, le massacre des Innocents, detective novel
 L'Affaire Fualdès, detective novel (based on the  dealing with murder of Antoine B. Fualdès)
 L'Affaire Gouffé, detective novel
 L'Affaire Lafarge, le mystère du Glandier, detective novel
 L'Alsacienne, detective novel
 L'Amant de la Duchesse, novel
 Les Amants du passé, sentimental novel
 L'Amour à crédit, novel
 L'Amour vengeur, sentimental novel
 Les Amours d'une ouvrière, sentimental novel
 Anastay, un officier assassin, detective novel (based on Louis Anastay)
 Un ancêtre de Landru, Pel, l'horloger empoisonneur, detective novel (based on Albert Pel)
 L'Ange et le démon, detective novel
 L'Ange du trottoir, novel
 L'Assassin des cœurs, detective novel
 L'Assassinat du Courrier de Lyon, detective novel (based on the Courrier de Lyon case)
 L'Assassin du Marquis de Morès, detective novel (based on Marquis de Morès)
 L'Archevêque assassiné, detective novel
 Aventures de Max Forter, novel
 Les Bas-Fonds de Chicago, detective novel
 Les Bas-Fonds de Marseille, detective novel
 La Bataille pour l'amour, sentimental novel
 Les Beaux romans de l'Histoire, collection
 La Belle Courtisane, sentimental novel
 La Belle Marion, sentimental novel
 Bonnier, Garnier & Cie, detective novel
 Bourreau des femmes, detective novel
 Le Calvaire de Casse-Cœur, detective novel
 Le Calvaire du Lieutenant Ferbach, novel
 Captive, novel
 La Chanson des cœurs, spy novel
 Chantecoq, spy novel
 Le Chanteur de Montmartre, novel
 La Chasse aux monstres, novel
 Le Château du milliardaire, novel
 Cocorico, spy novel
 Cœur cassé, novel
 Un cœur déchiré, detective novel
 Les Compagnons du soleil, adventure novel
 Condamnée à mort, detective novel
 Connais-tu l'amour?, detective novel
 Un crime d'amour, novel
 Le Crime d'un aviateur, detective novel
 Le Curé aux abeilles, detective novel
 La Dame de Paris, novel
 Du dancing au trottoir, sentimental novel
 La Dernière Incarnation de Judex, detective novel
 Les Derniers Chouans, novel
 Les Deux Parigotes, novel in collaboration with Ph. Vayre
 La Devineresse, sentimental novel
 Le Divorce de Joséphine, historical novel
 Le Docteur Laget, le drame du poison, detective novel (based on Dr Pierre Laget)
 Le Don Juan des grands bars, detective novel
 Le Drame des chauffeurs, detective novel
 Le Drame de la rue de la Pépinière, detective novel
 L'Enfant du Curé, societal novel
 L'Enfant des Filles, societal novel
 L'Épouse qui tue, detective novel
 Esclave d'une courtisane, novel
 Les Étapes du bonheur, detective novel, in collaboration with Aristide Bruant
 Le Fantôme du Père Lachaise, detective novel
 Féerique aventure, novel
 La Femme Weber, l'ogresse de la Goutte d'Or, detective novel (based on Jeanne Weber)
 La Fiancée de Lothringer, sting novel
 La Fille du Diable, detective novel
 Fille-mère''', society novel
 Le Fils de l'Aigle, historical novel
 Flétrie et vengée, sentimental novel
 Fleur d'ajonc, sentimental novel
 Fleur du pavé, novel
 Galerie criminelle, detective collection
 Le Grand Amour d'une favorite, sentimental novel
 Le Grand Amour d'un petit gars, novel
 Un grand seigneur assassin, l'affaire Choiseul-Praslin, detective novel
 Guyot l'étrangleur, detective novel
 L'Homme au masque de fer, adventure novel (based on the Man in the Iron Mask)
 Un Homme de proie, novel
 L'Homme aux sortilèges, novel
 L'Homme aux trois masques, society novel
 L'Homme qui sourit, novel
 L'Homme qui tue, novel
 Impéria, detective novel
 Les Incarnations de Judex, detective novel
 L'Incendiaire, detective novel
 Interdit de séjour, detective novel in collaboration with P. Gilles
 L'Introuvable Assassin, l'affaire Cadiou, detective novel (based on a 1913 crime in Landerneau)
 Jean Bart, dieu des mars, adventure novel (based on Jean Bart)
 Jean Chouan, tome I: La Bataille des cœurs, tome II, La Citoyenne Maryse Fleurus, (1926) adventure novel (based on Jean Chouan)
 Lacenaire ou le Napoléon des bandits, detective novel (based on Pierre François Lacenaire)
 Landru, detective novel (based on Henri Désiré Landru)
 La Loi du Talion, novel
 Louise et Gabrielle, sentimental novel
 La Loupiote, spy novel, in collaboration with Aristide Bruant
 Madame tête de Boche, spy novel, in collaboration with Aristide Bruant
 Mado la blonde, novel
 La Maison hantée, detective novel
 Mandrin, adventure novel (based on Louis Mandrin)
 La Marchande de bonheur, detective novel
 Marquise et Gigolette or Les Drames de l'amour or Les Drames de la vie, novel
 Martyres de l'amour... vengez-vous, detective novel
 Les Martyres de Paris, sentimental collection
 Mata-Hari, spy novel (based on Mata Hari)
 Les Mémoires d'une Masseuse, novel
 Méphisto, novel
 Mestorino, detective novel
 Miousic détective, detective novel
 La Môme Coco, sentimental novel
 La Môme Printemps, sentimental novel, in collaboration with Aristide Bruant
 Le Mystère du train bleu, detective novel
 Les Mystères de la Bastille, novel
 Les Mystères du bonnet rouge, detective novel
 Les Nouveaux Exploits de Chantecoq, eight detective novel
 Les Nouveaux Exploits de Judex, detective novel
 Les Nouveaux Gangsters de Paris, detective novel
 La Nouvelle Mission de Judex, detective novel
 L'Ogre amoureux, detective novel
 On les a!, spy novel
 Nos grands mufles, novel
 Le Père de la Loupiote, novel, in collaboration with Aristide Bruant
 Le Petit Clown, detective novel
 Poker d'As, novel
 La Pommerais, un médecin empoisonneur, detective novel (based on Desire-Edmond Couty de la Pommerais)
 Pour l'amour et la liberté, novel
 Pour la couronne de France, novel
 Pour les jeunes, novel
 Prado ou le tueur de filles, detective novel (based on Prado)
 Pranzini, l'assassin de la rue Montaigne, detective novel (based on )
 Princesses du trottoir, societal novel
 La Prisonnière du château de Nantes, novel
 Les Quatre Sergents de La Rochelle, historical novel
 La Redingote grise, novel
 Reine, femme et mère, novel
 Le Roman d'une chanteuse, novel
 Le Roman d'un jeune officier pauvre, sentimental novel
 Rose fleurie, novel
 Les Sacrifiées, novel
 Sauvée par l'amour, novel
 Le Secret du légionnaire, novel
 Les Secrets de Bolo révélés, detective novel (based on Bolo Pasha)
 Serrez vos rangs, novel in collaboration with Aristide Bruant
 Seule avec son cœur, novel
 Seznec a-t-il été assassiné, detective novel (based on the Seznec Affair)
 Le Sorcier de la Reine, novel
 La Soutane, novel
 Surcouf, roi des corsaires, aventure novel (based on Robert Surcouf)
 Le Tambour d'Arcole, novel (based on the )
 Le Temps des miracles, novel
 Ma Tendre musette, sentimental novel
 Tête de Boche, novel in collaboration with Aristide Bruant
 Les Tonsurés, novel
 Les Travailleuses, societal novel
 Les Trois Ombres, novel
 Les Trois légionnaires, novel in collaboration with Aristide Bruant
 Le Tueur de femmes, detective novel
 Pour l'amour d'une belle, sentimental novel
 Suis-je un assassin?, novel
 Va... petit mousse, novel
 Le Vampire de Düsseldorf, detective novel (based on Peter Kürten)
 Vidocq, adventure novel (based on Eugène François Vidocq)
 La Vierge du Moulin Rouge, novel
 La Ville aux illusions, novel
 Zapata, adventure novel

Adaptations of literary works for cinema

1906: Fleur de Paris distribué by Louis Aubert with Mistinguett
1906: Fille-Mère distribué by Louis Aubert
1916–1917: Judex by Louis Feuillade with René Cresté and Marcel Lévesque
 Nouvelle mission de Judex 
1921: L'Aiglonne, by Émile Keppens and René Navarre 
1923: Vidocq, by Jean Kemm
1923: Mandrin, by Henri Fescourt
1923: Ferragus, adaptation of the novel Ferragus by Honoré de Balzac 
1925: Surcouf
1925: Les Misérables, by Henri Fescourt
1925: Jean Chouan, by Luitz-Morat
1927: Poker d'As, by Henri Desfontaines
1927: Belphégor, by Henri Desfontaines
1927: Les Cinq Sous de Lavarède, by Maurice Champreux
1928: L'Argent, by Marcel L'Herbier
1931: Méphisto with Jean Gabin in his first speaking role
1947: Mandrin directed by René Jayet
1962: Mandrin by Jean-Paul Le Chanois 
1963: Judex by Georges Franju) with Channing Pollock, Francine Bergé and Édith Scob

External links 
 Arthur Bernède on Data.bnf.fr
 

1871 births
1937 deaths
People from Redon, Ille-et-Vilaine
19th-century French novelists
20th-century French novelists
20th-century French male writers
19th-century French dramatists and playwrights
20th-century French dramatists and playwrights
French crime fiction writers
French male screenwriters
20th-century French screenwriters
French fantasy writers
Writers from Brittany
French male novelists
19th-century French male writers